América Móvil is a Mexican telecommunications corporation headquartered in Mexico City, Mexico. It is the 7th largest mobile network operator in terms of equity subscribers and one of the largest corporations in the world. América Móvil is a Forbes Global 2000 company. As of Q1, 2019, América Móvil had 277.4 million wireless subscribers, and 84.3 million fixed revenue generating units ("RGUs", consisting of fixed voice, fixed data and Pay TV units).

History
América Móvil was created in 2001 when Telmex spun off its wireless mobile activities from its landline and internet activities.

On November 15, 2005, the company signed an international pact with Ooredoo to jointly deliver various international services. In 2006, América Móvil made a bid to acquire Verizon's Latin American and Caribbean operations and unified its brands (Comcel Colombia, Porta in Ecuador, Telcel in México, Tracfone in the US and CTI Movil in Paraguay, Uruguay and Argentina) under Claro unbrella. América Móvil acquired 100% of Jamaican mobile operator Oceanic Digital, under the brand name MiPhone in August 2007. By 2007, América Móvil's valuation was over $100 billion. In the US, its prepaid mobile subsidiary Tracfone had 8.6 million customers. 2007 was also the year América Movil's owner Carlos Slim became the richest person on the planet. In 2008, América Móvil launched the iPhone in Latin America. In 2009, América Móvil partnered with Nokia to use Nokia maps as its location-based service in Latin America. The group also launched the first Android phone in Latin America.

In January 2010, it made an offer to buy Carso Telecom and Telmex International ($21 billion for Telmex) in order to better compete against Spain's Telefonica and Malaysia's Telekom Malaysia. The acquisition was approved by the CFC (Comisión Federal de Competencia) Antitrust Office in Mexico on February 11, 2010. América Móvil had once been Telmex' mobile division, but had grown far larger than its former parent since its spinoff in 2001.

In early August 2013, América Móvil offered to take over the remaining 70% stake of the Dutch telecommunications company KPN for 7.2 billion Euros ($9.49 billion). América Móvil currently owns close to 30% of KPN. The Dutch government has warned against this acquisition quoting it as a threat to national security. The Dutch government's intervention comes after the council representing employees of KPN urged authorities to halt América Móvil's planned bid.

In 2018, the company's chief executive Daniel Hajj announced that América Móvil is seeking a TV license in Mexico.

In January 2019, America Movil announces the acquisition of Telefonica's operations in Guatemala and El Salvador for $333 million and $315 million respectively. However, the agreement for Telefonica Moviles and Telefonica Multiservicios in El Salvador, under the Movistar brand, was cancelled by mutual agreement with Telefonica in 2020 due to the conditions imposed by the monitoring of competition in El Salvador.

Monopoly issues
In 2012, the OECD estimated that lack of competition in telecommunications had cost the economy of Mexico $25 billion per year. The company was accused of charging especially high interconnectivity fees to thwart the competition. During the years before 2010, due to stricter regulations throughout Latin American countries, América Móvil's market shares shrunk and Telefónica gained grounds there. In 2013, América Móvil held 75% of the Mexican telecommunications market, which led the government to lead major antitrust reforms.

Description
The company's world headquarters are located in Mexico City, Mexico. Its Mexican subsidiary Telcel is the largest mobile operator in that country, commanding a market share in excess of 70%. The company operates under its Claro subsidiaries in many countries in Latin America and the Caribbean, these include the Dominican Republic, Costa Rica, El Salvador, Guatemala, Honduras, Nicaragua, Peru, Argentina, Uruguay, Chile, Paraguay, Puerto Rico, Colombia and Ecuador. In Brazil it also operates Claro and other subsidiary Embratel. It owns 14,86% of KPN in the Netherlands and has done a bid on 100% of the shares. The group has also fully consolidated the Telekom Austria Group into its financial reporting, owning 51.0% of its shares and using the Austrian operator to expand América Móvil's European network.

, the company was one of the top four telecommunications companies in the world and boasted 290,000 kilometres of Fiber-optic cable, making it the largest in infrastructure.

, América Móvil registered an annual profit of $5 billion. With assets of over $67 billion, the company is currently the largest company in Mexico by assets with Banorte very closely behind them with assets of over $59 billion It is highly likely that the company will buy a group of companies with at least $29 billion in assets in 2013 in the pension, insurance, payroll, currency exchange and mutual funds industries to secure their position as the most asset rich company in Mexico. And with a market value of over $93 billion, the company is currently the most valuable in Mexico, more than the next three most valuable companies combined.

América Móvil global wireless customers
As of Q1 2019:
North America
  Mexico - Telcel 75.611 million
Central America and the Caribbean
  Costa Rica  Dominican Republic  El Salvador  Guatemala  Honduras  Nicaragua  Panama  Puerto Rico - Claro 21.741 million
South America
  Colombia - Claro 29.887 million
  Peru - Claro 11.818 million
  Brazil - Claro 56.383 million
  Argentina  Paraguay  Uruguay - Claro 24.370 million
  Ecuador - Claro 8.308 million
  Chile - Claro 6.720 million
Austria and CEE 20.908 million
  Austria - A1
  Bulgaria - A1 Bulgaria
  Belarus - A1
  Croatia - A1 Hrvatska
  Slovenia - A1 Slovenija
  Serbia - A1 Srbija
  North Macedonia - A1 Macedonia
  Liechtenstein - Telecom Liechtenstein (sold in 2020)
Global wireless customers 277.425 million

Former assets
  United States - TracFone Wireless (TracFone, NET10 Wireless, Straight Talk, SafeLink Wireless, SIMPLE Mobile, Total Wireless and Telcel América) 21.599 million; acquired by Verizon Communications

América Móvil wireless technology by country

South America
 CDMA (800/1900MHZ), GSM/GPRS/EDGE (850/1900MHZ), UMTS/HSDPA (850/1900MHZ) first UMTS live by América Móvil LTE 
 TDMA (800MHZ, discontinued in 2009), GSM/GPRS/EDGE (900/1800MHZ), UMTS/HSDPA (850/2100MHZ), LTE (700MHZ/1800MHZ/2600MHZ)
 TDMA (800MHZ, discontinued in 2009), GSM/GPRS/EDGE (850/1900MHZ), UMTS/HSDPA (850MHZ, 1900MHZ), LTE (2600MHZ, 700MHZ)
 TDMA (800MHZ), GSM/GPRS/EDGE (850MHZ soon 1900), UMTS/HSDPA (850MHZ soon 1900) LTE 
 GSM/GPRS/EDGE (850/1900MHZ), UMTS/HSDPA (850MHZ soon 1900) LTE 
 CDMA (1900MHZ), GSM/GPRS/EDGE (850/1900MHZ), UMTS/HSDPA (850MHZ soon LTE

Caribbean
 CDMA (800/1900MHZ), GSM/GPRS/EDGE (850/1900MHZ), UMTS/HSDPA (850MHZ soon 1900) LTE 
  GSM/GPRS/EDGE (850/1900MHZ), UMTS/HSDPA (850MHZ soon 1900) LTE 
 CDMA (800MHZ), GSM/GPRS/EDGE (850MHZ), UMTS/HSDPA (850MHZ) LTE

Central America
 CDMA (1900MHZ), GSM/GPRS/EDGE (900/1900MHZ), UMTS/HSPA (1900MHZ) first HSPA (High-Speed Packet Access) live by América Móvil LTE 
 GSM/GPRS/EDGE (1900MHZ), UMTS/HSDPA (1900MHZ) LTE 
 GSM/GPRS/EDGE (1900MHZ), UMTS/HSDPA (1900MHZ) LTE 
 GSM/GPRS/EDGE (1900MHZ), UMTS/HSDPA (1900MHZ) LTE 
 GSM/GPRS/EDGE (1900MHZ), UMTS/HSDPA (850MHZ) LTE

North America
 TDMA (800MHZ), GSM/GPRS/EDGE (850/1900MHZ), UMTS/HSDPA (850/1900MHZ), LTE (1700MHZ)

Europe
 GSM/GPRS/EDGE (900/1800MHZ), UMTS/HSDPA (900/2100MHZ), LTE (800/1800/2600MHZ)
 GSM/GPRS/EDGE (900/1800MHZ), UMTS/HSDPA (900/2100MHZ), LTE (800/1800/2600MHZ)
 GSM/GPRS/EDGE (900/1800MHZ), UMTS/HSDPA (2100MHZ), LTE (1800MHZ)
 GSM/GPRS/EDGE (900MHZ), UMTS/HSDPA (2100MHZ), LTE (800/1800MHZ)
 GSM/GPRS/EDGE (900/1800MHZ), UMTS/HSDPA (900/2100MHZ), LTE (800/1800/2600MHZ)
 GSM/GPRS/EDGE (900/1800MHZ), UMTS/HSDPA (900/2100MHZ), LTE (800/1800MHZ)
 GSM/GPRS/EDGE (900/1800MHZ), UMTS/HSDPA (2100MHZ), LTE (800/1800/2600MHZ)
 GSM/GPRS/EDGE (900/1800MHZ), UMTS/HSDPA (2100MHZ), LTE (800MHZ) (sold in 2020)

See also

 List of mobile network operators of the Americas

References

External links
 
 

 
Mobile phone companies of Mexico
Telecommunications companies of Mexico
Companies based in Mexico City
Conglomerate companies of Mexico
Conglomerate companies established in 2000
Telecommunications companies established in 2000
Multinational companies headquartered in Mexico
Companies listed on the Mexican Stock Exchange
Companies listed on the Madrid Stock Exchange
Companies listed on the New York Stock Exchange
Mexican brands
Mexican companies established in 2000